Claude L. Pickens, Jr. (born 1900 in Alexandria, Virginia – 1985 in Annisquam, Massachusetts) was, with his wife Elizabeth Zwemer Pickens, an American missionary in northwestern China. Working with the China Inland Mission, his surveys in 1933 and 1936 of the Hui and Tibetan peoples produced important photographic collections.

References

1900 births
1985 deaths
American photographers
American Anglican missionaries
Photography in China